Live in Wacken is the first live album by the hard rock/power metal band Unisonic. The album was recorded during the band's performance at Wacken Open Air Festival on August 5, 2016.

The album includes a bonus DVD, which contains the video footage of 6 songs.

Track listing

Bonus DVD

Personnel
 Michael Kiske - lead vocals
 Kai Hansen - lead & rhythm guitars, backing vocals
 Mandy Meyer - lead & rhythm guitars
 Dennis Ward - bass, backing vocals, producer, engineer, mixing
 Kosta Zafiriou - drums, percussion

References

External links
 Unisonic official website
 EarMusic official website

2017 albums
Albums produced by Dennis Ward (musician)